Lang Jeffries (June 7, 1930 – February 12, 1987) was a Canadian-American television and film actor.

Biography

From 1958 to 1960, Jeffries starred as Skip Johnson in the adventure television series Rescue 8.

He starred in several American films in the 1960s, including Don't Knock the Twist (1962).

Jeffries starred as Vibio in the foreign film, La Rivolta degli schiavi, or The Revolt of the Slaves, with his wife Rhonda Fleming cast as Fabiola. Jeffries persuaded producers to cast him in the role after he traveled to Rome with his wife and discovered that the leading male role had not been cast. After he and Fleming traveled to Madrid to film, they discovered that the director, Nunzio Malasomma, would not speak to either of them, so Jeffries directed them both.

He starred in other films set in classic Rome such as Sword of the Empire (1964) and Fire Over Rome (1965) as well as Requiem for a Gringo, a Spaghetti Western.

Personal life 
Jeffries married to Rhonda Fleming at The Little Church of the West in Las Vegas in April 1960. They divorced in January 1962.

On August 13, 1966, while living in Rome, Jeffries married Gail Harris, the mother of John Paul Getty III. Brett Halsey was the best man and Heidi Bruehl was the maid of honor. Jeffries and Harris later divorced, and Jeffries went into real estate and boat business in the US.

Jeffries died on February 12, 1987, in Huntington Beach, California, after a bout with cancer. He was survived by his third wife, mother, and brother.

Selected film credits 

 The Revolt of the Slaves (1960)
 Don't Knock the Twist (1962)
 Alone Against Rome (1962)
 Sword of the Empire (1964)
 Fire Over Rome (1965)
 Agente X 1-7 operación Océano (1965)
 Z7 Operation Rembrandt (1966)
 Spies Strike Silently (1966)
 Special Code: Assignment Lost Formula (1966)
 The Killer Lacks a Name (1966)
 The Spy with a Cold Nose (1966)
 Mexican Slayride (1967)
 Mission Stardust (1967) 
 Lotus Flowers for Miss Quon (1967)
 The Hotheads (1967)
 Requiem for a Gringo (1968)
"The Junkman" (1981) - Arthur Wheeler

References

External links

1930 births
1987 deaths
American male film actors
American male television actors
Male actors from Greater Los Angeles
Male actors from Ontario
20th-century American male actors